Çelebi Island is an Aegean island in Turkey.

It is situated in the center of a gulf facing Bitez.

Recently, the visitors had brought five rabbits to the uninhabited island. Without a predator, the rabbits multiplied quickly and they began to threaten the plant cover of the island. Although the municipality tried to feed the rabbits they face the risk of starvation

References

Islands of Turkey
Aegean islands
Islands of Muğla Province
Bodrum District